Chiru Navvutho is a 2000 Indian Telugu-language film directed by G. Ram Prasad from a story written by  Trivikram Srinivas. The film stars Venu Thottempudi, Prema, debutante Shaheen and Prakash Raj. The score and soundtrack is composed by Mani Sharma. It was second movie in Venu's career after his first hit Swayamvaram (1999). It turned out to be a Super Hit at the box-office with critics praising Trivikram Srinivas's writing and Venu's acting.

The film won three Nandi Awards including Best Feature Film. It was later remade into Kannada as Premakke Sai (2001) and in Tamil as Youth (2002). Shaheen reprised her role in both remakes. A few scenes were inspired by the 1997 Italian film Life Is Beautiful. The film was unofficially made in Hindi as Muskurake Dekh Zara.

Plot
The story revolves around Venu, who is an orphan and a talented chef. His philosophy is to live happily with a smile (Chirunavvu) all the time. His uncle wants to marry him with his daughter Aruna. Aruna runs away from the house during the marriage.

Venu goes to the city to find a job. There he meets Sandhya. During a night party, her soft drinks glass was adulterated with alcohol and she was about to be raped. Then Venu saves her from the goondas. Sandhya becomes close to Venu and both of them are fond of each other. During her birthday party, she announces that she will soon marry Pratap. Venu becomes upset. When asked about his disappointment, Venu tells Sandhya that he loves her, for which she says apologises. Venu believes that Sandhya still loves him. Venu pursues his quest for the love of Sandhya. Meanwhile, Sandhya observes the characters of selfish Pratap and smiling Venu.

Venu gets a call from a police station that Aruna was saved by the police when she attempted suicide. Her lover cheated Aruna after elopement. Venu gets her back to his home and heals her emotional wounds. Sandhya observes Venu and becomes an admirer. She feels that Venu is her best friend. Later it revealed that Pratap is Aruna's lover who cheated her for the sake of Sandhya's property.

Sandhya, caught in confusion, asks her mother about her definition of love. Her mother advises: "It's better to marry a person who loves you than marrying a person whom you love".

Those words changed the mind and heart of Sandhya and she decides to return to Venu. Sandhya turns a runaway bride and goes to Venu's house with marriage costumes. But Venu, who has his own attitude and wisdom, makes Sandhya return to the wedding. Then he takes Pratap into a room and blackmails him to reveal about Aruna for the dropping out on marriage and gives him a check of 1 crore (which was given by Sandhya's father to Venu to forget Sandhya) and marries Sandhya with the support of Pratap and Sandya's father will. Later Pratap lies to Sandhya's father that Venu emotionally blackmailed him to marry Sandhya or else he will kill himself that's why to support his love he sacrificed her. Then her father tells him that if he has another daughter he would marry her to him and then the film ends when Sandhya's father cancels the check which he had given to Venu in front of jaw-dropped Pratap.

Cast
Venu Thottempudi as Venu
Prema as Aruna
Shaheen as Sandhya
Prakash Raj as Pratap
Chandra Mohan as Venu's uncle
Giri Babu as Sandhya's father
Priya as Priya
Sunil as Sunil
Brahmanandam 
M. S. Narayana
Gundu Sudarshan 
Nutan Prasad 
Ananth Babu
Rajitha

Soundtrack

The music of the film was composed by Mani Sharma.

Awards
Nandi Awards - 2000
 Best Feature Film - Gold - P. V. Syam Prasad 
 Best First Film of a Director - G. Ramprasad
 Best Screenplay - G. Ramprasad

Filmfare Awards
 Best Music Director - Mani Sharma

References

External links
 

2000 films
Telugu films remade in other languages
Films scored by Mani Sharma
2000s Telugu-language films
Indian comedy-drama films
2000 comedy-drama films